Guitar Hero II is a music video game developed by Harmonix and distributed by RedOctane, and is a sequel to Guitar Hero.  The game was released first to PlayStation 2 in 2006 but later released for the Xbox 360 in 2007.  Guitar Hero II challenges players to recreate the lead guitar portions of many rock music songs using a specially designed guitar-shaped controller, based on either a Gibson SG for the PlayStation 2 version, a Gibson Explorer for the Xbox 360 version, or else a standard console controller. As notes scroll down the screen towards the player, the player must hit both the fret buttons on the guitar controller and the strum bar at the same time to successfully hit the notes. Successfully hitting notes improves the player's performance in the game and also raises their score, while missing notes will reduce the player's performance, and a poor performance may end the song prematurely. Each song can be played at one of four difficulty levels: Easy, Medium, Hard and Expert. These levels reflect the number of fret buttons used and the number and frequency of the notes to be performed.

There are 64 songs total in the PlayStation 2 version while there are 74 songs total for the later Xbox 360 version. The Xbox 360 version adds an additional 24 downloadable songs via Xbox Live Marketplace, bringing the total to 98 songs.

Game disc songs

Main setlist
There are 40 songs in the main Career mode for the PlayStation 2 version, and 48 songs in the Xbox 360 version. Songs are organized by tiers that are related to the song's difficulty, and there are differences between the PlayStation 2 and Xbox 360 ordering due to the extra songs. Each tier at a given difficulty is unlocked in order, and a tier is completed once three to five songs (depending on the difficulty level) and the tier's encore song are successfully completed. Once a song is unlocked in a tier at any difficulty, it is available for the quick play, competitive, and co-operative modes.

Most songs in the game are covers of the original songs performed by WaveGroup Sound, but there are some master recordings as indicated below. Each song has a lead guitar track and either a bass or rhythm guitar track that can be played in practice or cooperative modes.

 Song has a rhythm guitar track instead of a bass guitar co-operative play track.

Bonus songs
There are 24 bonus songs in the PlayStation 2 version of Guitar Hero II and 2 additional songs for the Xbox 360 version. All bonus songs are unlockable by using in-game money within the game's store. Once purchased, they are playable in quick play, competitive, and co-operative modes. The song "Raw Dog" by The Last Vegas was selected as part of the "Be a Guitar Hero" contest for the release of Guitar Hero II.

All bonus songs are master recordings, and where marked, include rhythm guitar rather than bass guitar tracks.

Downloadable content
The Xbox 360 version of the game allows for the use of downloadable content available through Xbox Live Marketplace.  These are typically released as packs of three, or as single song. These packs include songs from the original Guitar Hero for the PlayStation 2. Additional packs consist of songs that have not been featured in Guitar Hero before, and are masters, even though some are indicated as covers in the game. As of April 1, 2014, these songs are no longer available in the Xbox Live Marketplace.

References

General
 

Specific

External links
 Official website

II